Veleň is a municipality and village in Prague-East District in the Central Bohemian Region of the Czech Republic. It has about 1,800 inhabitants.

Administrative parts
The village of Mírovice is an administrative part of Veleň.

History
The first written mention of Veleň is from 1318.

References

External links

 (in Czech)

Villages in Prague-East District